Van der Werff, Van der Werf and Van de Werf are Dutch toponymic surnames, originally meaning "of the (ship)yard" or "of the wharf". Notable people with the surname include:

Van der Werff 
Adriaen van der Werff (1659–1722), Dutch painter
Aucke van der Werff (born 1953), Dutch politician
Bo van der Werff (born 1992), Dutch speed skater
Emily St. James, formerly VanDerWerff (born 1982), American critic, journalist, podcaster and author
 (born 1946), Dutch botanist
Maikel van der Werff (born 1989), Dutch footballer
Pieter van der Werff (1665–1722), Dutch painter
 (1529–1604), Dutch mayor during the Siege of Leiden

Van der Werf 
 (born 1969), Belgian jazz saxophonist
Gerwin van der Werf (born 1969), Dutch writer
Hanneke van der Werf (born 1984), Dutch politician
Marieke van der Werf (born 1959), Dutch politician
Stephanie Vander Werf (born 1986), Panamanian presenter, model and beauty pageant

Van de Werf 
Frans Van de Werf (born 1950s), Belgian cardiologist

See also 
Van de Werve

Dutch toponymic surnames
Dutch-language surnames
Surnames of Dutch origin